The Class 471 electric motor unit, commonly known as CityElefant, is a double deck electric multiple unit operating on 3 kV DC overhead wires produced by Škoda Vagonka, a subsidiary of Škoda Transportation, since 1997 and operated by the České dráhy rail transit operator on its suburban services around Prague and Ostrava, Czech Republic. A single unit consists of a Class 471 power car with first class seating, a single Class 071 passenger car and a Class 971 cab car. They are replacement for defunct ČD Class 451, and successor to scrapped ČD Class 470.

Czech railways ordered in total 83 units. The last unit for the Czech Railways was delivered in March 2013. In addition, variants differing in power system and other parameters, have been ordered by Lithuanian Railways, Železničná spoločnosť Slovensko and Ukrainian Railways.

Derived units

Czech Railways
In 2019, ČD concluded a contract push-pull sets similar to those for Deutsche Bahn. The trainsets will used from Ostrava to Frenštát pod Radhoštěm, in operation with ČD Class 750.7. In March 2021, they were tested in Cerhenice with ČD Class 242 and ČD Class 750.7. They were originally launched in 2020, but will not be operated until 2021.

Lithuanian Railways
The Lithuanian Railways ordered 13 broad gauge units of class EJ 575. The first train was delivered in 2008 and the last unit was delivered in 2017. 
They are operated on the route Vilnius – Kaunas since December 2008 , Vilnius – Trakai and Vilnius – Minsk (Belarus). Units consist of two and three cars. They have very similar interior like Czech class 471.

ZSSK
The ZSSK operates 19 units of class 671 and 10 push-pull units of class 951.

Ukrainian Railways
In January 2011, the Ukrainian Railways ordered two broad gauge units of class EJ 675. Both of them are six-car units. The units were to be the first trains of a series of 50 to 60 units, however no further purchases were made. They currently operate on the route Kharkiv – Kyiv – Ternopil.

Deutsche Bahn
DB Regio ordered 6 locomotive-hauled push-pull trainsets. Trainsets will be used on Nuremberg–Munich high-speed railway. Push pull units will be hauled by locomotives Škoda 109E. Units are successor of Czech class 471. Trainsets were originally expected to be delivered in 2016, but they are entered in service in the 4th quarter of 2020.

Accidents

 On June 28, 2010 a CityElefant derailed in Ústí nad Labem. 1 driver died and 11 people were injured.

 On September 6, 2019 a commuter train collided with a semi-trailer truck at a level crossing. 8 people were injured.

Gallery

References

External links

 
 

Articles containing video clips
Double-decker EMUs
Electric multiple units of the Czech Republic
Train-related introductions in 1997
3000 V DC multiple units
Škoda vehicles